Strolling Jim (1936–1957) was the first Tennessee Walking Horse to become World Grand Champion of his breed. Since Strolling Jim's death, a restaurant, street, and an annual ultramarathon in his hometown of Wartrace, Tennessee have been named after him.

Life

Strolling Jim was foaled in 1936 near Viola, Tennessee, and was bred by Ed Gilliam. Strolling Jim was sired by Wilson's Allen and out of Allen's Strolling Jennie. Through his sire he was half-brother to Midnight Sun and Haynes Peacock. He was a chestnut with a left hind sock, star, and snip on his nose.

Strolling Jim was first trained to pull a wagon and a plow. Like many horses at the time, he was used as a working farm horse until he was seen by a well-known Walking Horse trainer at the time, Floyd Carothers. Carothers thought the young gelding had potential, bought him for $350 and took him into training.

Strolling Jim was a three-year-old in 1939, when the first Tennessee Walking Horse National Celebration was held in Wartrace. He was shown by Floyd Carothers and the pair won the World Grand Championship.

After his win, Strolling Jim was sold multiple times and finally sold out of state to a farm in California. From there he went to Pennsylvania, where he had a successful show career, before being flown back to Tennessee in 1947. There he was given to Carothers' widow, Olive. She showed him in a ladies' class in the 1948 Celebration, which was his final show before his retirement.

Strolling Jim died April 23, 1957 and was buried by his stables behind the Walking Horse Hotel owned by Mrs. Carothers in Wartrace. His grave, with engraved headstone, can still be viewed today.

Legacy
A color portrait of Strolling Jim, painted in 1940 by Bill Humphreys, is on display in the Tennessee Walking Horse National Museum, along with the leather saddle Strolling Jim wore at the 1939 Celebration.

In the late 1990s, some guests at the Walking Horse Hotel reported seeing Strolling Jim's ghost "prancing" around by his old stables on New Year's Eve. The restaurant at the hotel was named the Strolling Jim Restaurant after a renovation in 2007.

An annual 40-mile ultramarathon held in Wartrace is named in the horse's honor, and there is a street named Strolling Jim Drive in the nearby town of Shelbyville, Tennessee.

Pedigree

Notes
..

References

External links
 Video of Strolling Jim

Individual Tennessee Walking Horses
1936 animal births
World Grand Champion Tennessee Walking Horses